Tim Long (born June 14, 1969) is a comedy writer born in Brandon, Manitoba, Canada. Long calls Exeter, Ontario, his home town and has written for The Simpsons, Politically Incorrect, Spy magazine and the  Late Show with David Letterman. Currently credited as a consulting producer on The Simpsons, Long was - until Season 20 - credited as an executive producer.  His work has also recently appeared in The New York Times and The New Yorker. He also wrote the episode "Mr Roboto" for YTV's Mr. Young.

Long was also a consulting writer on The Simpsons Movie.

He attended high school at South Huron District High School in Exeter, Ontario, Canada.

Long graduated from University College at the University of Toronto with a major in English Literature and pursued graduate studies in English at Columbia University. He was an intern at Spy magazine under E. Graydon Carter before joining the staff of The David Letterman Show, where he wrote for three years, including one year as Head Writer.  In 2008, Long developed and wrote a pilot for the Showtime network entitled "Kevin and the Chart of Destiny". He is currently developing an HBO series for Molly Shannon, and was also hired by producers Richard Donner and Lauren Shuler Donner to adapt The Goonies into a Broadway musical.  He has won five Emmy awards, and been nominated for eight others.

Writing credits

The Simpsons episodes
Long has written the following episodes:

"Simpsons Bible Stories" (with Matt Selman and Larry Doyle) (1999)
"Treehouse of Horror X" (Desperately Xeeking Xena) (1999)
"Saddlesore Galactica" (2000)
"Behind the Laughter" (with George Meyer, Matt Selman, and Mike Scully) (2000)
"Skinner's Sense of Snow" (2000)
"New Kids on the Blecch" (2001)
"Half-Decent Proposal" (2002)
"Bart vs. Lisa vs. the Third Grade" (2002)
"Brake My Wife, Please" (2003)
"She Used to Be My Girl" (2004)
"Homer and Ned's Hail Mary Pass" (2005)
"Mobile Homer" (2005)
"Million Dollar Abie" (2006)
"You Kent Always Say What You Want" (2007)
"Homer and Lisa Exchange Cross Words" (2008)
"The Devil Wears Nada" (2009)
"Elementary School Musical" (2010)
"MoneyBART" (2010)
"Bart Stops to Smell the Roosevelts" (2011)
"Moe Goes from Rags to Riches" (2012)
"Lisa Goes Gaga" (2012)
"Moonshine River" (2012)
"Love is a Many-Splintered Thing" (2013)
"The Kid Is All Right" (2013)
"Married to the Blob" (2014)
"Bull-E" (2015)
"Springfield Splendor" (with Miranda Thompson) (2017)
"Haw-Haw Land" (with Miranda Thompson) (2018)
 "D'oh Canada" (with Miranda Thompson) (2019)
 "Todd, Todd, Why Hast Thou Forsaken Me?" (with Miranda Thompson) (2019)
 "Panic in the Streets of Springfield" (2021)
 "Poorhouse Rock" (2022)
 "Homer's Adventure Through the Windshield Glass" (2023)

External links

 
 Long, Hot Summer The New Yorker July 2010
 Thanksgiving With the Far-Flung Mulligans The New York Times, November 2009
 Our True North The New York Times, July 2009
Mark Polishuk, S-M-R-T writer Tim Long talks some Simpsons University of Western Ontario Gazette, October 28, 2004.
Simpsons writer wows hometown crowd: Grand Bend Strip, December 12, 2007.
American Migraine: The Democrats' Year of Victory 236.com, January 30, 2008

1969 births
Living people
Canadian television writers
University of Toronto alumni
Columbia Graduate School of Arts and Sciences alumni
Writers from Brandon, Manitoba
Annie Award winners